Freda Ellen "Fuzz" Barnes  (12 August 1902 – 17 February 1991) was a New Zealand law clerk and political activist. She was born in Lyttelton, New Zealand on 12 August 1902.

References

1902 births
1991 deaths
New Zealand activists
New Zealand women activists
People from Lyttelton, New Zealand
20th-century New Zealand women politicians
20th-century New Zealand politicians
New Zealand Labour Party politicians
New Zealand justices of the peace